Alexander Ketzer (born 10 November 1993) is a German Biathlete. He is a member of the B2-Kader (junior category of the German Ski Association).

Ketzer was 16 years old as he joined the ski camp. After his graduation in 2012 he became a member of sport division of Bundeswehr (German army) as well as participant of Junior Championships. Since 2014 he has been training in German Ski Association school in Ruhpolding, where he joined team SZ Uhingen.

Career 

 Biathlon Junior World Championships, 2014 Presque Isle (United States)
 European Junior Games (EYOWF) — Bronze, 2011 Czech Republic
 Winner of German Championships in sprint, Clausthal-Zellerfeld, 2010
 German Junior Championships:
 1st place in Relay, 2012 Oberhof
 1st place in Relay, 2013 Großer Arbersee
 1st place in classic Sprint, 2013 Ruhpolding
 1st place in Individual, 2014 Altenberg
 2nd place in Individual, 2012 Oberhof
 2nd place in Individual, 2013 Großer Arbersee
 2nd place in Relay, 2014 Altenberg

External links 
 Ketzer in Deutschen Skiverband (in German)
 Archive of interviews with Alexander Ketzer in SWP (in German)

References

1993 births
Living people
Sportspeople from Stuttgart (region)
German male biathletes
People from Esslingen (district)